William Bennett (born 1950) is a Canadian former politician. From 2001 until 2017, Bennett represented the riding of East Kootenay in the Legislative Assembly of British Columbia. He is a member of the  British Columbia Liberal Party and was appointed as Minister of Energy and Mines, and Minister Responsible for Core Review on June 10, 2013 by Premier Christy Clark. He previously served as Minister for Community Sport and Cultural Development, Minister of Energy, Mines and Petroleum Resources, Minister of Community and Rural Development, Minister of Tourism, Culture and the Arts, and Minister of State for Mining. Bennett has chaired the BC Legislative Select Standing Committee on Finance and Government Services, and chaired the BC Legislative Special Committee on Cosmetic Pesticides. He has been a member of various legislative committees and government committees, particularly focused on land use and natural resource issues. Before being elected, Bennett was a partner in a law firm in Cranbrook. He also owned and operated fly-in wilderness fishing and hunting lodges in the Northwest Territories and Manitoba.

Background

In 1976, Bennett earned an honours degree in English from the University of Guelph.  In 1992, he received a law degree from Queen's University.  He practiced law in Cranbrook, British Columbia for some time before becoming elected an MLA for East Kootenay in 2001.

On June 16, 2005, Bennett was appointed to cabinet as B.C.'s Minister of State for Mining. He resigned from this position on February 6, 2007.

On June 23, 2008, Bennett was re-appointed to cabinet as B.C.'s Minister of Tourism, Culture and the Arts. He was re-elected in May, 2009.

In June 2009, he was appointed as B.C.'s Minister of Community & Rural Development.

In June 2010, he was appointed as B.C.'s Minister of Energy where he served until November 17, 2010.

In June 2013, he was appointed as B.C.'s Minister of Energy and Mines and Minister Responsible for Core Review.

Electoral record

External links
Legislative Assembly of BC

British Columbia Liberal Party MLAs
1950 births
Living people
Members of the Executive Council of British Columbia
People from Cranbrook, British Columbia
21st-century Canadian politicians